The battle of the Jullundur Doab took place in 1765, between the Durranis and the Sikh Misls as part of the Afghan-Sikh wars which ended with Afghan victory as the Sikhs failed to seize any plunder.

Background
Ahmad Shah Abdali marched his seventh campaign into India after hearing reports about the Sikh triumphs, with 18,000 Afghans and adding another 12,000 soldiers under the chief of Qalat, Nasir Khan Baluch.
On the way from Sirhind to Jullundur Doab, Ahmad Shah Abdali ransacked and plundered the entire country, massacring people without any distinction between Sikhs and non-Sikhs. Many people ran away and hide themselves to protect their lives. Even upon entering Jullundur Doab, after crossing the Beas, terrified civilians escaped to either North towards the hills or South of Sutlej towards the desert, while others hid in the thick vegetation or Dholbaha caves and den, leaving all their properties and resources behind to just save their women and children from being the slaves of the Durranis.

Battle
While in Jullundur Doab, the advance guards of the Durranis commanded by Jahan Khan came across the Sikhs who had been watching their progress. Jahan Khan was well aware of the tactics of the Sikhs and stood his ground, waiting for the reinforcement of the main army but the Sikhs created devastation and destruction upon the advance guards and as the reinforcements arrived under the command of Nasir Khan, the Sikhs adopted their typical tactics of silently vanishing from sight with Nasir Khan in their pursuit for six miles to a ruined village, but after waiting till nightfall, unsuccessfully finding any Sikh, he returned.

The Sikhs re-appeared on the bank of Sutlej while the baggages were being moved across the river but due to Ahmad Shah's strict orders, no one from his army moved and stayed firm at their positions, which resulted with the Sikhs unsuccessfully seizing anything and returning after few hours of skirmish.

Aftermath
Ahmad Shah Abdali crossed the river with his army and marched towards Kunjpura via Pinjore, avoiding any conflicts with the Sikhs. But after reaching Kunjpura, Ahmad Shah was shocked to see that Sikhs seized everything that Ahmad Shah had plundered, and to avoid losing any more loot to the Sikhs, he gave up his futile campaign to move towards Delhi, thus returning homeward.

References 

Battles involving the Durrani Empire
Battles involving the Sikhs